Willow Patterson (born January 22, 1995), known by the stage name Willow Pill, is an American drag performer. She is best known as the winner of season 14 of RuPaul's Drag Race in 2022.

Early life 
Patterson was raised in Denver, Colorado and attended Colorado State University.

Career 

In an interview with KGNU in 2016, Willow Pill explained her drag persona was "a mix of 41 and 14... I'm kind of obsessed with little stoner girls as well as older women, like moms, that can't catch a break." Her first performance was at a Colorado State University drag show, where she wore "a pink '90s housewife tracksuit, complete with glasses and a pearl necklace." She performed a comedy routine and danced to a mix of Missy Elliott and Gwen Stefani songs.

In 2022, Willow Pill gained wider prominence as a contestant on season 14 of RuPaul's Drag Race, where she won the main challenge on the third episode, earning a cash prize of $5,000. Her Snatch Game performance as Drew Barrymore placed her in the bottom seven, and she participated in the lip-sync tournament on episode eight. She won the first round against Bosco. She placed in the bottom a second time during episode 14, and was required to "lip sync for her life" against Angeria Paris VanMicheals. Following their performance of "Telephone" by Lady Gaga ft. Beyoncé, neither was eliminated, resulting in five contestants advancing to the finale, a first for the series.

On the April 22, 2022, season finale, Willow Pill performed "I Hate People" and defeated Lady Camden in a lip-sync battle to Cher's version of ABBA's "Gimme! Gimme! Gimme! (A Man After Midnight)" and was declared the season's winner, earning a cash prize of $150,000, the highest amount awarded to date in a regular season so far. Willow Pill is also the first openly transgender person to win a regular season of RuPaul's Drag Race in the United States, and the fourth openly transgender contestant to win a season of the Drag Race franchise at the time of their crowning.

Personal life 
Patterson has had cystinosis her whole life and identifies as trans femme, as one of the five transgender contestants of Season 14. She came out via social media: “It's taken me a long time to come to terms with my transness because so much space has been taken up by my illness," Patterson wrote in one of her posts. She uses she/they pronouns.

Filmography

Television

Web series

Music videos

Awards and nominations

Notes

References

External links
 

Living people
Colorado State University alumni
LGBT people from Colorado
People from Denver
RuPaul's Drag Race winners
Transgender drag performers
1995 births